Vanessa Herzog (née Bittner; born 4 July 1995) is an Austrian speed skater. She competed at the 2013 World Sprint Championships in Salt Lake City, and at the 2014 Winter Olympics in Sochi.

Herzog is the current holder of the Austrian records in the 500, 1000 and 1500 metres.

She married her coach Thomas Herzog on 16 September 2016.

Personal records

References

External links

1995 births
Austrian female speed skaters
Speed skaters at the 2014 Winter Olympics
Speed skaters at the 2018 Winter Olympics
Speed skaters at the 2022 Winter Olympics
Olympic speed skaters of Austria
Sportspeople from Innsbruck
Living people
World Single Distances Speed Skating Championships medalists
World Sprint Speed Skating Championships medalists
21st-century Austrian women